Doctors is a British medical soap opera which began broadcasting on BBC One on 26 March 2000. Set in the fictional West Midlands town of Letherbridge, the soap follows the lives of the staff and patients of the Mill Health Centre, a fictional NHS doctor's surgery, as well as its two sister surgeries, the University of Letherbridge Campus Surgery and Sutton Vale Surgery. The following is a list of characters that first appeared in Doctors in 2022, by order of first appearance. All characters are introduced by the programme's executive producer, Mike Hobson. Hazeem Durrani (Ashraf Ejhbair) began appearing in January after he was introduced as a relative of Ruhma Carter's (Bharti Patel). Clare Wille then joined the cast in February as Davina Hargrove, a friend of Zara Carmichael's (Elisabeth Dermot Walsh). Princess Buchanan (Laura White) made her first appearance in March as a trainee doctor from Sutton Vale, as well as nurse practitioner Maeve Ludlow (Clelia Murphy). Kia Pegg then debuted in April as receptionist Scarlett Kiernan. Roxy Piper (Fiona Skinner) then joined in September as Emma Reid's (Dido Miles) neighbour. Then in October, Samuel Morgan-Davies joined the cast as police constable Gareth Lewis. Additionally, multiple other characters appear throughout the year.

Hazeem Durrani

Hazeem Durrani, portrayed by Ashraf Ejjbair, first appeared on 17 January 2022 and made his final appearance on 5 April 2022. Ejjbair announced via Instagram that he would be appearing in Doctors on a recurring basis and that he began filming for the soap in September 2021. Hazeem was introduced to the series as a relative of Ruhma Carter (Bharti Patel) who stays with her following travelling in Thailand. He is followed by Daisha Rashid (Sophie Kandola), with whom he shared a casual relationship with whilst travelling. Daisha tells Hazeem and Ruhma that she has nowhere to stay due to her relationship with her parents being tumultuous and informs them that she is set to stay in a hostel. Ruhma allows her to stay at hers alongside Hazeem, to his annoyance since he does not want a serious relationship. He eventually dumps her and after realising that Ruhma and Daisha have formed a close bond, he demands they cut contact with each other.

Ruhma introduces Hazeem to Bear Sylvester (Dex Lee), who sets Hazeem up with various job interviews. However, he turns down potential jobs and misses an interview due to falling asleep, leading Ruhma to demand he gets a job and pays rent for living with her. She tells him to "get his act together" and gets him a temporary job on reception at the Mill Health Centre. What to Watchs Simon Timblick described Hazeem as "lazy". Receptionists Karen Hollins (Jan Pearson) and Valerie Pitman (Sarah Moyle) show different attitudes towards having Hazeem work with them on reception. Karen is unhappy with his lack of work experience, while Valerie believes having him work at the Mill will be a good experience and trains him. However, Hazeem "is left shaken" after his first patient encounter. However, he eventually "finds his groove". After receiving an offer for a better job, Hazeem makes the decision to leave the Mill.

Davinia Hargrove

Davinia Hargrove, portrayed by Clare Wille, appeared between 8 and 22 February 2022. She was introduced as an old school friend of Zara Carmichael (Elisabeth Dermot Walsh) after she moves to the Midlands to pursue growth in her clothing company. Timblick (What to Watch) described Davinia as a "high flying fashion businesswoman". It was confirmed by Timblick that her arrival in the fictional town would mean that she will share a lot of scenes with Zara. He also hinted that the rekindling of their friendship could mean the end of Zara's friendship with long-term friend Emma Reid (Dido Miles). Zara is "thrilled" to have Davinia in town and she invites Zara to a fashion show where she admits that she does not have many friends.

Afterwards, Davinia asks Zara if she can act as a cover story by telling her husband, Julian Hargrove (Henry Douthwaite), that she is staying there. She explains that she is cheating on Julian and needs a cover for her secret relationship. Due to loving Davinia's "go-getter attitude", she agrees, which earns the disapproval of Zara's partner, Daniel Granger (Matthew Chambers). Julian unexpectedly travels from London and turns up at Zara's house to find that Davinia is not there, and after she takes several hours to show up, he questions why she is lying to him. The two argue and he agrees to go back to London. Davinia and Zara meet up with fellow former classmate Belinda Cooper (Emma Cooke), who admits that she was nervous of the pair whilst at school. Davinia takes pride in her mean reputation, nastily reminding Belinda about an incident where a school teacher made her cry, leaving Zara to be "taken aback by her bitchy behaviour". Zara realises that Davinia has not grown up and decides to cut their friendship off.

Rosie Colton

Rosie Colton, portrayed by Janice Connolly, first appeared on 24 February 2022 and made her final appearance on 6 September 2022. She was introduced as a receptionist at Sutton Vale Surgery, which the Mill take over. When she meets business manager Bear Sylvester (Dex Lee) and surgery partners Zara Carmichael (Elisabeth Dermot Walsh) and Daniel Grangers (Matthew Chambers), Rosie fills them in on the details of Sutton Vale. This includes the case of missing person Dr. Jacob Ashdown, who randomly went missing. Rosie gets emotional on several occasions over his disappearance. Rosie is shown to be hapless with technology and co-worker Princess Buchanan (Laura White) makes a comment that she is ready to retire, which new lead GP of Sutton Vale, Al Haskey (Ian Midlane), is disappointed about. Rosie warns Al that Princess is trouble and that there is something about her that he should watch out for.

Jimmi Clay (Adrian Lewis Morgan) takes over as lead GP at Sutton Vale due to Al prioritising the care of his mother, which Rosie struggles with. He "has concerns" about Rosie's inability to cope with changes at her surgery, such as being unable to operate the new computer system and the staff changes. He speaks to Rosie about her situation and unknowingly persuades Rosie to retire. He asks Rosie to arrange a staff meeting which she gets upset at; Maeve Ludlow (Clelia Murphy) informs Jimmi that it is Rosie's last day at Sutton Vale and hints that she may feel unappreciated. He then arranges a last-minute goodbye party for her. Months after her departure, she learns that Jacob has been found dead and arrives at the crime scene with flowers. She informs DI Mick Hartley (Martin Walsh) that she believes Princess murdered Jacob. In March 2023, Connolly announced via Twitter that she would be returning to Doctors as Rosie later in the year.

Princess Buchanan

Princess Buchanan, portrayed by Laura White, first appeared on 2 March 2022. She was introduced as a trainee doctor at Sutton Vale Surgery, which the Mill take over. When Bear Sylvester (Dex Lee) gives Princess a tour of the Mill, she likes what she sees, and it was noted by Timblick (What to Watch) that Princess "makes an impression" upon her arrival at the Mill. Daniel Granger (Matthew Chambers) asks Sid Vere (Ashley Rice) to become Princess' trainer. Sid is impressed by Princess' skills as a doctor, with it being noted by Timblick that she is a "hard and dedicated worker". Princess meets with Daniel and Zara Carmichael (Elisabeth Dermot Walsh) to discuss her future at the Mill. Despite them trying to have her situated at Sutton Vale, Princess pushes them to make her primarily working at the Mill, since she prefers the opportunities it has for her career. Princess begins to impress everybody at the Mill with how she has settled into the work regime, but her "cunning and manipulative side" comes into play when she starts "playing the staff for fools". After Sid becomes unreliable with her training, Princess visits her mother, Constance (Linda Hargreaves). She asks Constance if her uncle Zach, a doctor, can help her finish her medical training instead of the Mill, to which Constance refuses. Princess blackmails receptionist Scarlett Kiernan (Kia Pegg) for which she receives a two-week suspension. She is later at the centre of a murder investigation of her former boss, Dr. Jacob Ashdown, who she often clashed with prior to his death.

Over the duration of numerous months, Timblick noted that the character had made a conscious effort to "turn over a new leaf" and get on with her colleagues at the Mill. She becomes keen to impress them and pitches that an ultrasound machine be supplied for the Mill from the partners' budget, to which she gets told no. However, she secures an ultrasound using her uncle, to which Sid thanks her for. However, after Scarlett secretly breaks the machine, Princess goes "on the warpath" with a strong belief that Scarlett is responsible. After nobody believes Princess and become disinterested in her fury, she "realises that nobody is on her side and has decided... to hell with 'em all!" She starts being rude to her colleagues and patients again, as well as contacting a doctor from a different surgery about getting a job there. It was confirmed that this had formed the start of her exit, with Princess' final scenes set to air in January 2023 after being let go from the Mill.

Metros Chris Hallam felt that the addition of Princess to the cast had "generated fireworks" for Doctors and despite her "extremely manipulative personality", he was interested in learning more about the character. He found it hard to sympathise with the character but suggested that her unlikeable qualities may have been caused by a difficult childhood. After Princess' scheme with Scarlett, Hallam described her as "devilish", while his Metro colleague Duncan Lindsay tweeted that she is "such an icon". In May 2022, a viewer's comment about was published in TVTimes. They found Princess to be an unlikeable character and was surprised by her storyline. For her portrayal of the role, White was nominated for the British Soap Award for Villain of the Year. She has also received a nomination for Leading Acting Performance at the 2022 RTS Midlands Awards.

Maeve Ludlow

Maeve Ludlow, portrayed by Clelia Murphy, first appeared on 30 March 2022 and made her final appearance on 29 September 2022. Murphy's casting was announced in February, having began filming from a month prior to the announcement. Murphy was delighted to be given a direct offer to star in Doctors since it meant that she had job security following her decision to leave soap Fair City. She relocated from Ireland to Birmingham to appear as Maeve. Maeve was introduced as a nurse prescriber returning to Sutton Vale after a break away from the surgery. Due to being stressed out from caring for her mother, Gillian Ludlow (Diana Payan), and having numerous tasks to complete upon returning, Jimmi Clay (Adrian Lewis Morgan) tries to comfort her. Maeve "practically bites his head off" due to her stress, but later apologises for her harsh attitude. Maeve feels that due to Gillian having suffered a stroke, she should be in a care home, but she does not want to raise the issue with her. Jimmi offers to visit Gillian and speak to her about going into a care home, but Timblick (What to Watch) wrote that Jimmi would "make the situation worse for Maeve".

Dale Ashfield (Jack Davies), a regular patient of Maeve's, visits her for a consultation since he has genital herpes. However, Maeve becomes concerned about Dale since he has a strange cough and a rash. Numerous other patients display the same symptoms and she learns that these patients have been sourcing drugs from a dealer at a local nightclub, Radar. She sources the drugs and takes them to Rob Hollins (Chris Walker), who tells her that testing would take time. Jimmi gets Al Haskey (Ian Midlane) to contact a university worker who can test the drugs, who finds that the drugs are full of poisonous ingredients. Maeve pushes Dale for information, threatening him with police action, and he informs her that Gary McMullen (Mark Holgate) is the drug dealer. She visits his house and pretends to be a customer since she believes the police would be useless, "putting herself in terrible danger". Gary later arrives at Sutton Vale and threatens Maeve. Maeve and Jimmi flirt but are too afraid to make a move on each other, so after "a gentle push from some of their co-workers", they decide to go on a date together. Their relationship "continues to blossom" when Jimmi surprises Maeve by taking her to crazy golf for their second date.

The dead body of Dr. Jacob Ashdown, Maeve's former boss, is found buried in the woods, which leads to a murder investigation. Since Jimmi works with DI Mick Hartley (Martin Walsh), the investigating detective, he asks if Maeve can contribute any information about Jacob. She reveals that the pair were having an affair prior to his death, which she believes is irrelevant to the investigation. Jimmi pleads with her to tell Mick, and in response, she loses her temper with Jimmi. Mick later learns of the affair from email exchanges between Maeve and Jacob and brings her in for questioning, which makes Rob "wonder what else Maeve hasn't told them". However, she is cleared of the crime and burns her photos of Jacob. Maeve and Jimmi plan to take over Sutton Vale together and ask Bear Sylvester (Dex Lee) if he would like to be a fellow partner alongside them. He looks into the records and figures of the surgery which makes Maeve nervous. He discovers that at least 10% of the patients registered at Sutton Vale are ghost patients and notices that Maeve was heavily involved with the records. He begins to suspect that Maeve has stolen money through Sutton Vale. Jimmi is shown the proof of Maeve's involvement and forces her to confess to what she has done; she explaims that Jacob began adding ghost patients to get more money for the surgery, but it eventually led to Maeve taking money to pay for her mortgage and Gillian's care home. As she is set to run away, she is arrested by Rob after Jimmi informed him of Maeve's whereabouts.

Scarlett Kiernan

Scarlett Kiernan, portrayed by Kia Pegg, first appeared on 7 April 2022. She was introduced as an applicant for the receptionist position at Sutton Vale Surgery, as part of a storyline that sees the partners at the Mill Health Centre perform a takeover of the surgery. Scarlett is initially depicted as a truthful and short-tempered person who shocks the management at the Mill with her honesty. She is hired despite her "feisty attitude" and is shown to struggle with the job, when she gives the staff members attitude and argues with patients. She quits shortly after being hired, believing that her father, Brian (Simon Lowe), is receiving a promotion. Scarlett then makes a derogatory post on social media about how bad the Mill Health Centre and their staff are. She later learns that Brian has been made redundant and deletes the post, realising she needs her job back. As she settles into the Mill, she begins to make friends with her colleagues and show a more likeable side of herself. After her debut, What to Watchs Simon Timblick described Scarlett as a "surly" character and Chris Hallam of the Metro was surprised that Scarlett was hired, but admitted that she does show potential.

Princess Buchanan (Laura White) is intrigued when she overhears Scarlett's interest in learning about the vulnerable patient assessment scheme (VPAS). Emma explains that Scarlett is attempting to seem keen to keep her job, since she is still on probation. Princess then "targets" Scarlett by pretending to be nice to her and suggesting a scheme in which it seems that she is doing more work than she really is. It is later revealed that Princess has a screenshot of Scarlett's derogatory post about the Mill. Princess then begins using Scarlett to do mundane tasks for her, but eventually, Scarlett refuses to help her in what was described as "tense scenes" by the Metros Chris Hallam. The pair clash once again when Scarlett threatens to report Princess for being unprofessional, which results in Princess blackmailing Scarlett with the screenshot of her online post about the Mill. Despite feeling as though she has no choice, she spills lemonade over Princess' outfit and Timblick remarked that Princess should not mess with Scarlett. For her portraya of Scarlett, Pegg has been nominated in the Breakthrough category at the upcoming RTS Midlands Awards.

Roxy Piper

Roxy Piper, portrayed by Fiona Skinner, first appeared on 23 September 2022 and made her final appearance on 11 October 2022. She was introduced as the "noisy new neighbour" of established character Emma Reid (Dido Miles). Emma becomes tired and grumpy after Roxy keeps her awake by having arguments in the street. She goes downstairs to tell her to keep the noise down and becomes curious about the cause of the argument. Emma receives further aggravation when Roxy argues with Lawrence Besson (Darren Hill). Despite Emma being concerned about the arguments, Roxy is shown not to "seem bothered about her latest confrontation". Emma questions Roxy on the noise and she tells Emma that she uses the house as a brothel.

Roxy tells Emma that she will try to keep the noise down, but a week later, there is glass shattering and Roxy screams out in pain. On her day off, Emma "jumps back into professional medical mode" to support Roxy through the drama. She invites Emma in and the pair begin to bond and become friends over a drink. Days later, Emma is startled to find the police raiding Roxy's house, with DS Matt Cassidy (Terry Mynott) leading the raid. Since she had confided in him about having a noisy neighbour days prior, Emma suspects that he had organised the raid, especially when he finds drugs that Roxy pleads are not hers.

Gareth Lewis

PC Gareth Lewis, portrayed by Samuel Morgan-Davies, first appeared on 28 October 2022. He was introduced as a newly hired police constable who is paired with Rob Hollins (Chris Walker). New to the job, Gareth is keen to "make his mark" and prove himself to Rob. He tries to follow every law to the book, until Rob shows him that not every case can be treated the same. His first case is with teenager Ethan Rowe (D'Nico Greaves), who has been caught stealing a purse from his landlord. Gareth initially wants to "lay down the law" with Ethan, until Rob helps him to treat him more humanly. Another case "takes an alarming turn" when Gareth finds the dead body of a missing person which traumatises him. Gareth then has a life-or-death situation when prisoner Brandon Skinner (Warren Donnelly) steals his cereal bar from his pocket and chokes on it.

Gareth is on patrol when he arrests a teenage arsonist, Rory Morgan (Danny Murphy). He catches Rory burning a scrapbook, some clothes and a plastic award in a metal bin down an alley. He attempts to run from Gareth, who catches him and takes him into Letherbridge Police Station on suspicion of arson and causing damage to public property. Gareth contacts Rory's legal guardian, Jez Appleby (Nigel Pilkington), who Gareth later uncovers has sexually abused Rory and that he was burnign Jez's belongings. He later confides in Emma about his insecurities with his job, who reassures Gareth that he is in line to become a good officer. However, after he sees a flyer advertising for work as a personal trainer, he applies and hands in his resignation to Rob. Rob does not accept the resignation and asks Gareth to reconsider. Days later, DS Matt Cassidy (Terry Mynott) requests to have Gareth drive him around. Rob thinks "paired with controversial copper Cassidy might not be the best thing", but as Gareth is excited to work with Matt, he allows it. Matt arrests Artie Jones (Richie Bratby) for assault and cites Gareth as a witness, who did not see anything. Gareth faces later struggles with the job during a case with rape victim Melissa Grant (Larner Wallace-Taylor).

Other characters

References

Doctors
2022
, Doctors